Delice d'Argental  is a  triple cream French cheese from the Burgundy region. It is made by hand from cow's milk. The addition of crème fraîche to the curds during manufacture provides for extra richness - developing an exceptionally creamy texture. This cheese has a soft bloomy rind which is yellow-white in colour. It is similar to Brie both in appearance and texture.

See also
 List of French cheeses
 List of cheeses

References 

French cheeses
Culture of Burgundy